The Unbeatables I (双天至尊I) is a Singapore drama series that was made by Singapore Broadcasting Corporation's (SBC) Channel 8. The popularity of the series led to the production of 2 follow-ups, The Unbeatables II and The Unbeatables III.

Cast

Li Nanxing as Yan Fei/Lin Jianfei
Zoe Tay as Luo Qifang/Long Jiajia
Zhu Houren as Long Tingguang
Chen Shucheng as Yan Kun
Cassandra See as Luo Wenxin
Lin Yisheng as He Xiangnan
Liang Weidong as Cai Haijie
Hong Huifang as Qiu Huaifeng
Richard Low as Qiu Dingtian

Synopsis

King of Gamblers, Yan Kun and King of Deception, Long Tingguang, both set their eyes on Coral Island - an undeveloped empty island- for their future casino landmark. Through underhanded methods, Long wins the gambling match with Yan and thus acquires the rights to the island. Yan is then forced to blind his own eyes, while his wife is made to commit suicide, leaving Yan's five-year-old son an orphan.

18 years later, Yan's son has grown up as Lin Jianfei. His happy-go-lucky attitude is a cover for his ultimate goal: to avenge his parents' misfortunes. His gambling skills draws the attention of Long's enemy, Qiu Huaifeng. She hires Lin to work for her family's casino and Lin uses this opportunity to perfect his gambling skills.

Later, Lin and his friend, Xiangnan, are mistakenly arrested for illegal gambling by policewoman, Luo Qifang. Qifang and her sister, Wenxin, both turn out to be Lin's neighbour. Over time, the bickering pair become romantically involved, and Lin reveals his true identity as Yan Fei, the son of the King of Gamblers.

Just as the young couple's relationship blooms, Qifang discovers that she is actually Long Jiajia - the long lost daughter and the only surviving child of Long, Yan Fei's arch enemy.

Production
A Singapore card expert, Robert Chew, was engaged to teach the cast card tricks. SBC also engaged Jiang Dou Hai, who directed gambling stunts in Hong Kong gambling films, to teach the cast for two months.

One of the few Singapore series (inclusive of the sequels) with gambling theme and the only one during the 1990s.

Accolades

References

Singapore Chinese dramas
1993 Singaporean television seasons